The Battle of Pinhoe was a battle between the Danes and the men of Devon and Somerset at Pinhoe, Devon.

The battle
In 1001, Vikings laid siege to Exeter, but due to the strong fortifications built during Athelstan's reign they could not break through. They then started pillaging nearby villages, and were met at Pinhoe by an army from the shires of Devon and Somerset. The battle was hard and the defenders nearly used up all their ammunition.

The priest of Pinhoe
A priest of Pinhoe wanted to resupply the troops with ammunition. He sneaked through the Danish lines and ran to Exeter to get arrows and arms. He successfully returned to the defending Saxons and supplied them with the weapons.

The burning of Pinhoe
The weapons were not sufficient for the Saxons to defeat the Vikings. The Vikings infiltrated Pinhoe and burned it to the ground. This was as a warning for the citizens of Exeter.

The legacy of the priest
The priest was awarded for his outstanding bravery an annual payment of 16 shillings. It was said that this sum was still paid to the Vicar of Pinhoe in Victorian times.

References

11th century in Devon
Military history of Devon
Pinhoe
1001 in England
Pinhoe
Pinhoe